Kozelsky (masculine), Kozelskaya (feminine), or Kozelskoye (neuter) may refer to:

Geography
Kozelsky District, a district of Kaluga Oblast, Russia
Kozelsky (rural locality) (Kozelskaya, Kozelskoye), name of several rural localities in Russia
Kozelsky (volcano), a volcano on Kamchatka Peninsula

People
Arno Kozelsky (b. 1981), Austrian soccer player
Kozelsky (family), a princely family of Rurikid stock

Other
8229 Kozelský, a main belt asteroid